Amborovy Airport , also known as Philibert Tsiranana Airport, is an airport in Mahajanga, Madagascar.

Airlines and destinations

Roads
The airport is linked to the city of Mahajanga by the National Road 54 (8 km).

References

External links

Airports in Madagascar
Mahajanga Province